Mario Antonio Cimarro Paz (born June 1, 1971) is a Cuban actor.

Biography 
Mario Antonio Cimarro Paz was born on June 1, 1971 in Havana, Cuba. He  is the son of Antonio Luis Cimarro and María Caridad Paz. He has a sister, named María Antonia Cimarro Paz.

Personal life 
In 1999, Cimarro married the Spanish-Venezuelan actress, Natalia Streignard whom he met while filming La mujer de mi vida. The couple divorced in 2006.

From 2009 to 2013, Cimarro was in a relationship with the Mexican actress, Vanessa Villela.

Since 2018, Cimarro is in a relationship with Slovak model Bronislava Gregušová. They had a baby on the 31st of August 2022.

Career 
He made his big screen debut in 1995 in Acapulco, cuerpo y alma.

In 1996, he made the theatrical seasons of Romeo y Julieta.

From 2003 to 2004, he was the Main role of the Colombian television series Pasión de Gavilanes with Natasha Klauss, Michel Brown, Juan Alfonso Baptista, Danna García and Paola Rey.

From 2005 to 2006, he was the Main role of the television series El Cuerpo del Deseo with Lorena Rojas.

He  had a recurring role on the USA Network's Necessary Roughness (2011–2013) and Jesus Cristo de Nazaret (2020).

In August 2019, he traveled to Paraguay to be part of the jury staff for the eighth season of the program Baila conmigo Paraguay.

In 2021, it is confirmed that the actor will give reprise his role of Juan Reyes Guerrero in the second season of Pasión de Gavilanes.

In 2023, Cimarro took part in Slovak rendition of Dancing with the Stars named Let's Dance with Vanda Poláková as his partner.

Telenovelas

Filmography
 The Cuban Connection (1997) – Pablo
 Managua (1997) – Chico
 Rockaway (2007) – Juju
 Puras Joyitas (2007) – SN
 Mediterranean Blue (2012) – Andres
 The Black Russian (2012) – Dominic

Discography
 Tu deseo (2008)

See also
 List of Cubans

References

External links
Official Website

1971 births
Living people
Cuban male film actors
Cuban male telenovela actors
Cuban male models